Robert Joseph Primes (born January 10, 1940) is an American cinematographer. He served as the cinematographer for the 1997 film Money Talks alongside, Russell Carpenter. Primes cinematography credits includes, Baadasssss!, Las Vegas, Aspen Extreme, Night Stalker, The Hard Way, Thirtysomething, Felicity, Bird on a Wire, Cash, They Call Me Bruce? and Quantum Leap.

Primes won two Primetime Emmy Awards and was nominated for two more in the category Outstanding Cinematography from 1995 to 2006.

References

External links 

1940 births
Living people
People from San Francisco
American cinematographers
Primetime Emmy Award winners